Keri Craig-Lee  (born 4 March 1958) is an Australian, multi-award-winning fashion designer and retailer. She was the first inductee into the National Retail Association (formerly the Retailers Association of Queensland – RAQ) Hall of Fame in 1987 at age 28, and remains a member of the Federal Executive Committee of Fashion Industries of Australia.

Family history and early life 

Craig-Lee was raised in Brisbane, Queensland. Her parents, Peter and Dianne Craig, founded House of Craig following success managing the Fifth Avenue brand and continue to run the Keri Craig Emporium in the Brisbane Arcade with her brother Jason.

She grew up in the Brisbane suburb of Ascot graduated St Margaret's Anglican Girls School in 1975, and in 1976 obtained a Diploma in Fashion Design and Marketing from Waukesha County Technical College, Wisconsin, United States.

Personal life 

Craig-Lee married Trevor Lee, Australian Country Choice chairman and director of the Lee Group Pty Ltd in 1986. The couple have two children, Cartier and Harrisson, and two stepsons, Anthony and Michael.

Career 

In 1977 Craig-Lee established the eponymous fashion label, Keri Craig, and opened boutiques in Brisbane and Sydney, with her label becoming available throughout Australia and overseas.

In 1984, she designed and coordinated Sir Elton John's Sydney wedding to Renate Blauel.

With her husband, Keri established Australian Country Choice in 1995, one of Australia's largest meat supply chains, as well as Keri Lee Charters and Sutherland Aviation.

Awards 

Craig-Lee's career saw her collecting more than 50 accolades for excellence in her endeavours.  Among those were her induction into the RAQ Hall of Fame at the age of 28, following three RAQ 'supreme' awards in 1981, 1982 and 1986. She was also the first Queenslander to be nominated for the FIA Australian Fashion Award.

In 2017, Craig-Lee was awarded the Medal of the Order of Australia (OAM) for her service to the clothing manufacturing sector, business and the community.

Publications 
In 2017, Craig-Lee released her first book, Keri Craig: the label, the lady, the lifestyle, a pictorial biography chronicling her career spanning almost 40 years and featuring contributions from politicians, personalities and photographers such as Richard De Chazal.

References 

1958 births
Living people
Australian fashion designers
Australian women fashion designers
Australian women company founders
Australian company founders
Recipients of the Medal of the Order of Australia
People educated at St Margaret's Anglican Girls' School